Abdul Samad Abdulla (died 25 August 2013) was a Maldivian politician and the Minister of Foreign Affairs. Dr. Abdul Samad died in office from kidney failure.

References

External links
 Official Website of the Ministry of Foreign Affairs, Republic of Maldives

2013 deaths
Foreign Ministers of the Maldives
Year of birth missing